KYCK (97.1 FM, "97 KYCK") is a radio station broadcasting a country format serving Grand Forks, North Dakota that's licensed to Crookston, Minnesota.  It first began broadcasting in 1979 under the call sign KDWZ.  The station is currently owned by Leighton Broadcasting. The station's main competitor is iHeartMedia's KSNR "100.3 Cat Country".

History
KYCK signed on in 1979 as KDWZ with a Top 40 (CHR) format. In 1981, as KKXL-FM signed on with a Top 40 format, KDWZ became KYCK (pronounced as "kick") with a country music format.

External links
97 KYCK Website
Leighton Broadcasting

YCK
Country radio stations in the United States